"Spoonman" is a song by the American rock band Soundgarden

It can also refer to:

 Artis the Spoonman, an American musician and street performer
 The Spoonman, an Australian radio program
 "Spoonman", a song from the 1994 album dubnobasswithmyheadman by Underworld

See also 

 Spoon (disambiguation)
 Spoony (disambiguation)
 Spoon (musical instrument)